The Baden-Württemberg Cooperative State University (German: Duale Hochschule Baden-Württemberg, DHBW) is an institution of higher education with several campuses throughout the state of Baden-Württemberg, Germany. It offers dual-education (or also cooperative education) bachelor's-degree programs in cooperation with industry and non-profit institutions in the areas of business administration, engineering, and social services. In 2011, it started a limited master's program.

History
The DHBW is the direct successor to the Staatliche Berufsakademie Baden-Württemberg. The first Berufsakademie was founded in 1974 as a new type of educational institution and recognized by the state of Baden-Württemberg in 1982. It grew quickly to include seven institutions at eleven different locations. By 2009 the combined student enrolment across all institutions had reached 23,409 students, involving around 8,000 cooperative education partners and over 90,000 graduated alumni. On March 1, 2009, all institutions in the state of Baden-Württemberg were consolidated to form the Duale Hochschule Baden-Württemberg.

Dual studies
DHBW offers job integrated learning (JIL) programs only. Job integrated learning (JIL) defines those work integrated learning (WIL) programs with compulsory internships, in which the student has to be employed by a single company during the complete duration of the study program and in which lectures and internships are geared to maximize applied learning and the transfer of knowledge. Therefore, the recruitment is exclusively done by the cooperative education partners, while the DHBW only has to verify the higher education entrance qualification. The three-year dual education program is divided into three-month phases alternating between the college and the cooperative education partner. The college phases provide traditional undergraduate education while the other phases provide insight and work experience in the field of the cooperative education partner. The dual education program operates on a non-stop, twelve-month schedule. Students are granted vacation days as stipulated in the three-year employment contract signed by the student and the cooperative education partner at the beginning of the program.

In 2011 the school introduced a Master's curriculum. It is mostly limited to DHBW alumni.

Currently the DHBW offers 21 courses of study with about 90 branches from the sections economic science, technics and social science.

Partner companies in the field of information technology are, e.g., SAP, Hewlett Packard Enterprise, IBM, Atos and Accenture. Examples in  engineering are Airbus, Siemens, Bosch, Freudenberg and Ziehl-Abegg.

Campuses and satellite campuses

References

External links
 Baden-Württemberg Cooperative State University
 Duale Hochschule Baden-Württemberg, Heidenheim
 Duale Hochschule Baden Württemberg, Heilbronn
 Duale Hochschule Baden-Württemberg, Karlsruhe
 Duale Hochschule Baden-Württemberg, Lörrach
 Duale Hochschule Baden-Württemberg, Mannheim
 Duale Hochschule Baden-Württemberg, Mosbach
 Duale Hochschule Baden-Württemberg, Ravensburg
 Duale Hochschule Baden-Württemberg, Stuttgart
 Duale Hochschule Baden-Württemberg, Villingen-Schwenningen

 
Universities and colleges in Baden-Württemberg
2009 establishments in Germany
Educational institutions established in 2009
Education in Stuttgart